Cheri Helt (born 1970/1971) is a restaurateur, an American politician and former Republican member of the Oregon House of Representatives who was elected on November 6, 2018, to replace Republican Knute Buehler who left his legislative seat to run unsuccessfully for governor. She disagreed with fellow Republicans on issues such as mandatory vaccinations for school enrollment. Helt represented the 54th district which includes most of Bend. She previously served on the Bend-La Pine School Board from 2010–2019.

Helt was defeated for reelection in 2020 by Democrat Jason Kropf. She ran for the nonpartisan office of state Commissioner of Labor and Industries in 2022. She advanced from the primary to a runoff election against Christina Stephenson. Stephenson defeated Helt in the November 8 general election.

References 

21st-century American women
Living people
Republican Party members of the Oregon House of Representatives
School board members in Oregon
Women state legislators in Oregon
Year of birth missing (living people)